Waltair railway division is one of the three railway divisions under East Coast Railway zone. A section of the division will be part of the new South Coast Railway zone upon operationalization.

The Rayagada railway division has been proposed to succeed a section of the existing Waltair division which will remain in the East Coast Railway zone upon bifurcation.

Main lines 
The main lines of the division are as follows:

Stations and categories 
The list includes the stations under the Waltair railway division and their station category.

Stations closed for Passengers -

Loco sheds 
The Diesel Loco Shed at Visakhapatnam, is the largest diesel shed in Indian Railways, with a capacity to accommodate 300 Diesel Locomotives. While, the Electric Loco Shed is currently holding 231 Electric locomotives.

It holds WDM-2 – 57, WDS-6 – 10, WDG-3A – 96 alongside 3 rail busses.

While, the Visakhapatnam Electric Loco Shed can accommodate 297 locomotives which includes WAG-5 – 83, WAP-4 – 21, WAP-7 - 35, WAG-6 – 9, WAG-9H – 172,

Performance and earnings 

Waltair division was awarded efficiency shields in eight categories. Vizianagaram and Tilaru was awarded best major and minor clean stations.
The division had transported  of load and  passengers. The passengers earnings were 

Due to industrialization in the modern era, the division equally serves the transportation needs of the port city of Visakhapatnam. The division serves major public sectors such as Visakhapatnam Port Trust, RINL, IOC, BPCL, HPCL etc.

See also 

 Divisions of Indian Railways

References

External links 
Waltair Division
East Coast Railway

 
Transport in Visakhapatnam

Divisions of Indian Railways